The 1996 All-Ireland Minor Hurling Championship was the 66th staging of the All-Ireland Minor Hurling Championship since its establishment by the Gaelic Athletic Association in 1928. The championship began on 1 May 1996 and ended on 29 September 1996.

Cork entered the championship as the defending champions, however, they were beaten by Tipperary in the Munster semi-final.

On 29 September 1996 Tipperary won the championship following a 2-14 to 2-12 defeat of Galway in a replay of the All-Ireland final. This was their 16th All-Ireland title and their first title since 1982.

Tipperary's Eugene O'Neill  was the championship's top scorer with 3-48.

Results

Leinster Minor Hurling Championship

First round

Quarter-final

Semi-finals

Final

Munster Minor Hurling Championship

First round

Second round

Final

Ulster Minor Hurling Championship

Semi-finals

Final

All-Ireland Minor Hurling Championship

Semi-finals

Finals

Championship statistics

Top scorers

Top scorer overall

Miscellaneous

 The All-Ireland final ended in a draw for the first time since 1984.

References

External links
 All-Ireland Minor Hurling Championship: Roll Of Honour

Minor
All-Ireland Minor Hurling Championship